Hollow Ground is the debut studio album by American musician Max Clarke, under his musical project Cut Worms. It was released on May 4, 2018, by Jagjaguwar.

Critical reception
{{Album ratings
| MC        = 80/100
| rev1      = AllMusic
| rev1score = 
| rev2      = Exclaim!
| rev2score = 8/10
| rev3      = MusicOMH
| rev3score = 
| rev4      = Pitchfork| rev4score = 7.2/10
}}Hollow Ground'' was met with "generally favorable" reviews from critics. At Metacritic, which assigns a weighted average rating out of 100 to reviews from mainstream publications, this release received an average score of 80, based on 7 reviews. Aggregator Album of the Year gave the release a 76 out of 100 based on a critical consensus of 8 reviews.

Tim Sendra from AllMusic said of the album: "With producers Jonathan Rado and Jason Finkel helping out, Clarke plays most of the instruments, vocally plays the role of both Phil and Don, and masterfully straddles the line between soda shop-sweet pop and richly twangy country as Hollow Ground's mix of jangling uptempo tracks, quiet ballads loaded with lap and pedal steel, and swaying midtempo doo wop roll by like the best songs on a greatest-hits album.

Track listing

Personnel

Musicians
 Max Clarke – primary artist, vocals, guitar
 David Christian – drums
 Kyle Avallone – bass
 Ron Budman – sax

Production
 Jason Finkel – mixing, producer
 Jonathan Rado – mixing, producer
 Jarvis Taveniere – mixing

References

2018 albums
Jagjaguwar albums
Albums produced by Jonathan Rado